The Allianz EurOpen Strasbourg-Golf de la Wantzenau was a golf tournament held in Alsace, France. It was played in 2009 and 2010 and formed part of the French domestic Allianz Golf Tour.

It was a stop on the satellite Alps Tour in its inaugural year before becoming an event on the second tier Challenge Tour schedule in 2010.

Winners

Notes

External links
Coverage on the Challenge Tour's official site

Former Challenge Tour events
Defunct golf tournaments in France